Thomas Léon Gaydu (born 23 July 1998) is a Guadeloupean footballer.

Career

In 2016, Gaydu signed for Inter Milan, one of Italy's most successful clubs, from Étoile Fréjus Saint-Raphaël in the French third division.

In 2017, he trialed unsuccessfully with English second division side Cardiff City, before contemplating quitting football.

For the second half of 2018/19, he returned to Guadeloupe with Solidarité-Scolaire.

References

External links
 
 Thomas Gaydu at playmakerstats.com (English version of leballonrond.fr)

Living people
1998 births
Guadeloupean footballers
Association football forwards
ÉFC Fréjus Saint-Raphaël players
Championnat National players
People from Pointe-à-Pitre
Guadeloupe international footballers